Killer Elite is a 2011 action thriller film starring Jason Statham, Clive Owen and Robert De Niro. The film is based on the 1991 novel The Feather Men by Sir Ranulph Fiennes and is directed by Gary McKendry.

Plot

In 1980, mercenaries Danny Bryce, Hunter, Davies and Meier are in Mexico to assassinate a man. Danny is shot when he becomes distracted after realising he has killed the man in front of the target's young child. Affected by this, Danny retires and returns to his native Australia.

The following year, Danny is summoned to Oman to meet a handler known as The Agent. He learns that Hunter failed a $6 million job. If Danny does not complete Hunter's mission, Hunter will be executed. Sheikh Amr, a Sheikh and deposed king of a small region of Oman, wants Danny to kill three former SAS troopers—Steven Harris, Warwick Cregg, and Simon McCann —for killing his three eldest sons during the Dhofar Rebellion. Danny must videotape their confessions and make their deaths look like accidents, all before the terminally ill sheikh dies. This will allow the sheikh's fourth son, Bakhait, to regain control of his father's desert region. Davies and Meier agree to help Danny for a share of the money.

Danny and Meier find Harris still living in Oman and gain access to his house pretending to be researchers making a documentary. After Harris confesses on videotape, they take him to the bathroom, intending to make it look like he slipped and hit his head. However, Harris's girlfriend knocks on the door. While Danny and Meier are distracted, Harris attempts to break free, causing Meier to shoot him.

In England, Davies travels to a pub known to be frequented by British military personnel and questions bar patrons about former SAS members in Oman. This is reported to the Feather Men, a secret society of former operatives protecting their own. Their head enforcer, Spike Logan, is sent to investigate.

Davies discovers Cregg preparing for a long nighttime march in wintry weather on the Brecon Beacons mountain range. Danny infiltrates the base, disguised in uniform, and drugs Cregg's coffee. Danny follows Cregg on the march and makes him confess before the drug sends him into shock to die of hypothermia.

Aware that the Feather Men are now following them, Danny decides to use a different tactic to kill their last target, Simon McCann, who is now working as a mercenary. Their plan is to set up a fake job interview to lure McCann out of his house and then to crash a remote-controlled truck into McCann's car. With the help of the inexperienced Jake, Meier kills McCann; however, Logan and his men were watching over McCann. A gunfight ensues, and Jake accidentally kills Meier. Danny and Davies part ways. Davies is tracked down by Logan's men, and is fatally hit by a truck while trying to escape.

Danny returns to Oman and gives the sheikh the last confession, which he has faked. Hunter is released, while Danny heads back to Australia and reunites with Anne, a childhood acquaintance. Soon, he is informed by the Agent that there is one last man who participated in the sheikh's sons' murders and that this man, Ranulph Fiennes, is about to release a book about his experiences in the SAS.

Danny sends Anne to France so Hunter can protect her. The sheikh's son confirms that Harris was innocent. Logan, meanwhile, traces Danny through the Agent and sends a team to protect the author, but Jake distracts them, allowing Danny to shoot Fiennes. He only wounds the man, however, taking pictures that appear to show him dead. Logan captures Danny, taking him to an abandoned warehouse, but then a government agent arrives and reveals that the British government is behind the events because of the sheikh's valuable oil reserves. A three-way battle ensues, with Danny escaping and Logan shooting the government agent.

Danny and Hunter head to Oman to give the sheikh the pictures. However, Logan arrives first, tells the sheikh the pictures are fake and then stabs him to death. The sheikh's son does not care; he gives Logan the money. Hunter spots Logan leaving, and they chase after him, along with the sheikh's men.

After stopping the sheikh's men, Danny and Hunter confront Logan on a desert road. Hunter takes some of the money for his expenses and his family. They leave the remainder, telling Logan that he will need it to start a new life after killing the government agent and acting against the wishes of the Feather Men and the British government. Danny says that it is over for him and that Logan must make up his own mind what to do. Danny reunites with Anne.

Cast

Production
The Internet Movie Database cites a number of locations used for filming. Filming began at Docklands Studios Melbourne in May 2010. In July 2010, Jason Statham's scenes were shot at the Brecon Beacons in Wales. Robert De Niro filmed a scene in Melbourne's Spring Street set in 1970s Paris. The scene of McCann's death by tanker truck was filmed on Dynon Road, Melbourne. The final scene was filmed on Little Collins Street in Melbourne.

Some London scenes were filmed in Cardiff—in July 2010, De Niro and Statham were seen filming outside The Promised Land Bar on Windsor Place. Other scenes shot in Cardiff were also on Windsor Place, showing the City United Reformed Church, Buffalo bar and various small business buildings. Agent's several meetings with other characters at a stone, columned monument were shot at the Welsh National War Memorial in Alexandra Gardens, Cardiff. A scene where The Welshman leaves a building was shot on Kings Road, Pontcanna, showing Kings Road Doctors' Surgery and residential buildings. Another scene was shot at The Blue Anchor Inn in East Aberthaw, Vale of Glamorgan.

In July 2010, filming took place near the Storey Arms outdoor centre in the Brecon Beacons. A number of 1970s period cars were in evidence, particularly a bright orange Austin Maxi.

Reception
The film, which had a gala-premiere at the 36th Toronto International Film Festival on 10 September 2011, has received negative reviews from critics. Rotten Tomatoes maintains Killer Elite with  approval rating with the consensus stating: "A rote, utterly disposable Jason Statham vehicle that just happens to have Clive Owen and Robert De Niro in it." Conversely, Roger Ebert gave it 3 stars out of 4, calling it director Gary McKendry's "impressive debut", noting he "understands that action is better when it's structured around character and plot, and doesn't rely on simple sensation."

Accolades
Despite the negative reviews, Killer Elite was nominated for Best Production Design and Best Visual Effects at the 2nd AACTA Awards.

The Feather Men
The plot for the film is based on the novel The Feather Men by Ranulph Fiennes. Several elements from the book were altered to make the film seem more believable to a cinema audience.
 Fiennes claims that a secret society called the "Feather Men", made up of retired and disabled SAS members, was operating in the shadows. They are called the "feather men" because their influence and intervention were subtle, like the touch of a feather. It is also an allusion to the three feathers of British Army regiments. Their job was to protect SAS personnel and their families and avenge wrongs or harm done to them.
 The mastermind behind the plot was changed from a Soviet-trained terrorist group called The Clinic to an Omani sheik who is inexplicably sent into exile after his three eldest sons die on jihad. The sheik hires a group of highly skilled Western mercenaries, gives them a limitless budget, and holds one of their friends as a hostage so that they will complete the task he sets for them.
 The targets are three SAS troopers, one of whom is still serving and is a decorated war hero, who served in Oman in the 1970s. Their deaths must appear accidental to avoid reprisals. In the film, an added complication is that they must confess to being murderers before they are killed.
 The Battle of Mirbat, a siege in which nine SAS troopers with 100 assorted Firqas under training and 30 paramilitary askars (armed police) held off a force of 250 insurgents, is mentioned in passing in the film but never explained. One of the sheik's three sons was supposed to have been killed in action there.
 In the film, the British Foreign Office is supposed to be in collusion with the sheik in order to guarantee oil leases on the sheik's land. They even force the "feather men" to back off with threats of imprisonment. However, the wealthy sheik is in exile and his son, a westernised playboy, shows no interest in returning to his homeland to claim his title. Therefore, even if the sheik's plot is successful, the British government will not have gained any leverage with the original landholders (and probably have a current relationship with the usurper who replaced him). The book has no such subplot.
 Fiennes claims that the "feather men" saved his life from an assassination attempt by The Clinic. In the book, "The Clinic" tried to ambush him at his farmhouse in Exmoor, but the "feather men" chased them off. In the film, he is a minor character who survives because the assassin feels regret and only maims him.
The military adviser for the film was Iain Townsley, a former member of a Sabre Squadron of 22 SAS. Townsley had served 25 years in the British Army, 18 of those with 22 SAS. He was, at that time, living in Australia, and by chance was introduced to the director Gary McKendry who offered him the job. Townsley maintained that "it's a good story, but not a true story".

References

External links

 
 

2011 films
2011 directorial debut films
British action adventure films
Films about the Special Air Service
Films based on British novels
Films based on military novels
Films set in Australia
Films set in France
Films set in Mexico
Films set in Oman
Films set in the 1980s
Films set in England
Films shot in Melbourne
Films shot in Wales
British vigilante films
Entertainment One films
Open Road Films films
Australian action adventure films
Films scored by Reinhold Heil
Films scored by Johnny Klimek
2010s action adventure films
2010s English-language films
2010s British films